Kankakee was an unincorporated community in LaPorte County, Indiana, in the United States. It took its name from the nearby Kankakee River.

Never much more than a railroad whistle-stop, nothing remains of the Johnson Township settlement called Kankakee.

References

Unincorporated communities in LaPorte County, Indiana
Unincorporated communities in Indiana